Guglielmo Giusti (born 1 December 1937) is a Sammarinese former sports shooter. He competed at the 1960 Summer Olympics and the 1972 Summer Olympics.

References

1937 births
Living people
Sammarinese male sport shooters
Olympic shooters of San Marino
Shooters at the 1960 Summer Olympics
Shooters at the 1972 Summer Olympics